Roger Raymond Fischer (June 1, 1941 – July 1, 2021) was a Republican member of the Pennsylvania House of Representatives.

Background
Born in the city of Washington, Pennsylvania on June 1, 1941, Fischer graduated from Washington High School in 1959, attended Thiel College, and then earned his Bachelor of Arts in math and physics from Washington and Jefferson College in 1963. After pursuing graduate studies at the Carnegie Institute of Technology, he then graduated from the United States Air Force Command and Staff College, and then earned his Master of Divinity from the Lutheran Theological Seminary and his Doctor of Ministry from the Pittsburgh Theological Seminary in 1998.

A second lieutenant in the United States Air Force, he then also served in the United States Air Force Reserves and Pennsylvania Air National Guard. Employed as a research engineer, he served on the board of directors for the Washington School District from 1965 to 1971. A Republican, he was elected to the Pennsylvania House of Representatives in 1966, and served ten consecutive terms, and then returned to professional as a minister.

References

Republican Party members of the Pennsylvania House of Representatives
Living people
1941 births
20th-century American politicians